Snellenia is a genus of moths in the family Stathmopodidae (formerly known as Stathmopodinae, subfamily of the Oecophoridae).

Species
Snellenia capnora Turner, 1913
Snellenia coccinea Walsingham, 1889
Snellenia flavipennis (R. Felder & Rogenhofer, 1875)
Snellenia hylaea Turner, 1913
Snellenia ignispergens Diakonoff, 1948 
Snellenia lineata (Walker, 1856)
Snellenia miltocrossa Turner, 1923
Snellenia tarsella Walsingham, 1889

References

External links

Stathmopodidae
Moth genera